2021 Bogor Mayor's Cup (Indonesian: Piala Walikota Bogor 2021) is a pre-season association football tournament organized by Association PSSI Bogor and Mayor of Bogor, Bima Arya Sugiarto.

This tournament was participated by 8 football teams from West Java and was held on 6–9 December 2021 at Pajajaran Stadium, Bogor.

Teams
West Bandung Regency
Persikabbar
Bogor Regency
Cibinong Poetra
Bogor City
Mutiara 97
Pakuan City
PSB
Cimahi City
Ebod Jaya
Depok City
Persikad 1999
Persipu

Stadium
This competition was held at the Pajajaran Stadium, Bogor.

Matches

Quarter-finals
Monday

Semi-finals
Wednesday

Finals
Thursday

See also
Bogor
Bima Arya Sugiarto

References

External links

Bogor
Football in Indonesia
2021 establishments in Indonesia